DTA sarl (Delta Trikes Aviation) is a French aircraft manufacturer based in Montélimar. The company specializes in the design and manufacture of ultralight trikes.

The company also specializes in the design of ultralight trike wings which are manufactured under subcontract by Ellipse.

DTA also designed and builds the J-RO autogyro, which aims to provide a similar experience to trike flying, but with rotary wings.

Aircraft

References

External links

Aircraft manufacturers of France
Ultralight trikes
Montélimar
Companies based in Auvergne-Rhône-Alpes